Aenetus cohici is a moth of the family Hepialidae. It is endemic to New Caledonia.

The wingspan is 107–121 mm. There are two colour morphs. The first has a background colour of yellowish-green with pastel violet spots. The second morph has a greyish-green background colour with yellowish-green patches faintly visible as transverse rows and pastel violet spots on the costal margin. The hindwings are pale orange in the basal area, blending into orange-white over the remainder of the hindwing.

The larvae have been recorded feeding on dead wood and polypore fungi. Later instars bore the wood of Nothofagus and Hibbertia species. They enter their host plant above ground level and construct a tunnel which extends into and then down the stem. The tunnel entrance is covered by a silken web containing frass.

References

Moths described in 1961
Hepialidae